P. Gregory Warden (born November 28, 1950) is an American archaeologist, President and Professor of archaeology at Franklin University Switzerland, and expert on Etruscan art, archaeology, and ritual, Roman architecture and Greek archaeology.

Biography
Born in Florence, Tuscany, to William Burnand and Franca Warden, he received a BA from the University of Pennsylvania, a MA and a Ph.D. from Bryn Mawr College. He is University Distinguished Professor Emeritus at Southern Methodist University. He taught at the University of Pennsylvania, Bowdoin College, and the University of Texas at Arlington. He has taught with the honors, Meadows Foundation Distinguished Teaching Professor, University Distinguished Professor, and also Altshuler Distinguished Teaching Professor at Southern Methodist University.

Warden's academic work is in Etruscan and Roman archaeology. He founded and co-directs Mugello Valley Archaeological Project (MVAP), which primarily works on the north Etruscan site of Poggio Colla, where twenty-one years of excavation have uncovered a sanctuary and settlement.

Warden is an elected foreign member to the Istituto Nazionale di Studi Etruschi ed Italici, Vice President of the Board of Trustees of the Etruscan Foundation, a member of the governing board of the Archaeological Institute of America.

Publications

Books
1985 The Metal Finds from Poggio Civitate (Murlo) 1966-1978
1990 The Extramural Sanctuary of Demeter and Persephone at Cyrene, Libya. Final Reports IV (with Andrew Oliver, Pam J. Crabtree, and Janet Monge)
1997 Classical and Near Eastern Bronzes in the Hilprecht Collection, Philadelphia
2004 Greek Vase Painting: Form, Figure, and Narrative. Treasures of the National Archaeological Museum in Madrid (editor)
2008 From the Temple and the Tomb. Etruscan Treasures from Tuscany (editor)

Peer-reviewed journal articles
Warden, P. Gregory. "The Domus Aurea Reconsidered." Journal of the Society of Architectural Historians 40, no. 4 (1981): 271-78. Accessed April 5, 2021. doi:10.2307/989644.
1994 The Course of Glory: Greek Art and Roman Context in the Villa of the Papyri at Herculaneum, Art History (with D. G. Romano)
2011 "Online Museum Review: The Chimaera of Arezzo: Made in Etruria?" American Journal of Archaeology 115.1 Online Forum 
Warden, P. Gregory. "The Vicchio Stele and Its Context" Etruscan Studies, vol. 19, no. 2, 2016, pp. 208-219. https://doi.org/10.1515/etst-2016-0017

Book chapters
2012 “Monumental Embodiment: Somatic Symbolism and the Tuscan Temple.” In Monumentality in Etruscan and Early Roman Architecture: Ideology and Innovation2012 “Pinning the Tale on the Chimera of Arezzo: The Monster as Ritual Sacrifice.” In Myth, Allegory, Emblem: The Many Lives of the Chimera of Arezzo2013 “The Importance of Being Elite: The Archaeology of Identity in Etruria (500-200 BCE).” In A Companion to the Archaeology of the Roman Republic2016 “Communicating with the Gods: Sacred Space in Etruria.” In A Companion to the Etruscans''

References 

Southern Methodist University faculty
American archaeologists
Linguists of Etruscan
University of Pennsylvania alumni
Bryn Mawr College alumni
Classical archaeologists
Living people
1950 births